The Ludwik Zamenhof Centre is a city cultural institution established in Bialystok at 19 Warszawska St. upon the motion of the president of the city. It was founded to celebrate the organization of the 94th World Congress of Esperanto that was held from 25 July to 1 August 2009 in Bialystok. The centre was officially opened for the visitors on 21 July 2009. At the beginning The Zamenhof Centre was a branch of The Centre of Culture in Bialystok, but it has been an autonomous cultural unit since January 2011.

The Zamenhof Centre offers the visitors a permanent exhibition - Bialystok of Young Zamenhof – and various temporary exhibitions, concerts, film projections, and theatre performances. Moreover, the centre regularly holds panel discussions, lectures, and literary promotions.

The Zamenhof Centre organises also numerous educational workshops for children and teenagers and introduces modern social and educational projects, such as Living Library and „Discover Bialystok” – an outdoor game realised in the urban area of the city.

Description 
The building where the Ludwik Zamenhof Centre is situated was included in the Jewish Heritage Trail, which was opened in June 2008 in Bialystok. The Trail was created by a group of University of Bialystok students and doctoral candidates – volunteers for the University of Bialystok Foundation. The building is also a part of the Trail of Esperanto and Many Cultures, which was open in June 2009.

Mission and activity 
All the centre's undertakings are planned so as to roam the frontier, in a broad sense, between cultures, worldviews, beliefs, nations, and sexes. The frontier is "a boiling ground”, and, at the same time, vitalizing one for art – that provides a perfect ground for establishing an open and honest, often difficult, but substantial dialogue. By facilitating the dialogue and allaying the disturbances in inter-human communication we aim to gradually weaken, and in the future to remove the barriers emerging from a natural fear of the other, unknown, and therefore frightening and threatening the integrity of our identity.

As education is a significant part of the centre's objectives, the scope of the centre's activity encompasses some classes for children devoted to the person of Ludwik Zamenhof, the Esperanto language, and also to the multiculturalism, history and tradition of Bialystok in a broad sense. Modern methods and teaching aids are applied in order to educate according to the idea of teaching by entertaining.

Permanent exhibition 

The permanent exhibition entitled Bialystok of Young Zamenhof is the main tool for promotion of the work and the person of Ludwik Zamenhof. This multimedia exhibition based on listening, video, and photographic materials provides the recipients with an attractive way to explore the past. Not only is it a presentation of historical materials, but also an attempt to recreate the atmosphere of the times when young L. Zamenhof was strolling along the streets.

The permanent exhibition is used as a substantial basis for numerous scripts of educational classes for children and teenagers.

Esperanto Library 
Esperanto – Libraro was opened on May 12, 2010, in the building of the Ludwik Zamenhof Centre as a branch of Lukasz Gornicki's Podlaska Library in Bialystok. It is the first public library in Poland that has a collection in Esperanto and publications devoted to this language. The library's opening hours: Tuesday, Wednesday, Thursday: 1 p.m. – 5.30 p.m., Friday: 1 p.m. – 5 p.m.

External links

 The Official The Ludwik Zamenhof Centre Website

Buildings and structures in Białystok
Esperanto culture
Museums in Poland
Organisations based in Białystok
Tourist attractions in Podlaskie Voivodeship